Wrangler's Roost is a 1941 American Western film directed by S. Roy Luby and written by John Vlahos and Robert Finkle. The film is the seventh in Monogram Pictures' "Range Busters" series, and it stars Ray "Crash" Corrigan as Crash, John "Dusty" King as Dusty and Max "Alibi" Terhune as Alibi, with Forrest Taylor, Gwen Gaze and George Chesebro. The film was released on June 4, 1941, by Monogram Pictures.

Plot
Black Bart, the notorious stagecoach robber, has reappeared after serving 7 years in prison, so the Range Busters are sent to investigate. They find out that this Black Bart is an impostor, since the original Black Bart is now an honest citizen. Now they have to set a trap and get the impostor.

Cast
Ray "Crash" Corrigan as Crash Corrigan 
John 'Dusty' King as Dusty King
Max Terhune as Alibi Terhune 
Forrest Taylor as Deacon Stewart 
Gwen Gaze as Molly Collins
George Chesebro as Miller 
Frank Ellis as Bull
Jack Holmes as Joe Collins
Walter Shumway as Grover

See also
The Range Busters series:

 The Range Busters (1940)
 Trailing Double Trouble (1940)
 West of Pinto Basin (1940)
 Trail of the Silver Spurs (1941)
 The Kid's Last Ride (1941)
 Tumbledown Ranch in Arizona (1941)
 Wrangler's Roost (1941)
 Fugitive Valley (1941)
 Saddle Mountain Roundup (1941)
 Tonto Basin Outlaws (1941)
 Underground Rustlers (1941)
 Thunder River Feud (1942)
 Rock River Renegades (1942)
 Boot Hill Bandits (1942)
 Texas Trouble Shooters (1942)
 Arizona Stage Coach (1942)
 Texas to Bataan (1942)
 Trail Riders (1942)
 Two Fisted Justice (1943)
 Haunted Ranch (1943)
 Land of Hunted Men (1943)
 Cowboy Commandos (1943)
 Black Market Rustlers (1943)
 Bullets and Saddles (1943)

References

External links
 

1941 films
1940s English-language films
American Western (genre) films
1941 Western (genre) films
Monogram Pictures films
Films directed by S. Roy Luby
American black-and-white films
Range Busters
1940s American films